The women's 4 × 110 yards relay event at the 1954 British Empire and Commonwealth Games was held on 7 July at the Empire Stadium in Vancouver, Canada. It was the first time that this event was contested replacing the medley relay.

Results

References

Athletics at the 1954 British Empire and Commonwealth Games
1954